In grand unified theories of the SU(5) or SO(10) type, there is a mass relation predicted between the electron and the down quark, the muon and the strange quark and the tau lepton and the bottom quark called the Georgi–Jarlskog mass relations. The relations were formulated by Howard Georgi and Cecilia Jarlskog.

At GUT scale, these are sometimes quoted as:

In the same paper it is written that:

Meaning that:

References

Grand Unified Theory